William Germano is an American editor and college professor. He served as editor-in-chief of Columbia University Press, then as vice-president and publishing director at Routledge, before becoming professor and dean of the faculty of humanities at Cooper Union.

Biography 
Germano was born and raised in Yonkers, New York. He received his B.A. from Columbia University and a Ph.D. from Indiana University Bloomington.

In 1982, Germano became the editorial director of Columbia University Press, publishing works by Paul Bové, Gayatri Spivak, as well as Paul de Man's last book, The Rhetoric of Romanticism.

After joining Routledge, he oversaw its publications in the field of science studies and cultural studies, promoting authors such as Judith Butler, Cornel West, bell hooks, Marjorie Garber, and Andrew Ross, and was considered "one of the most influential figures in literary criticism and theory over the past two decades."

In 2005, he left the publication after it underwent corporate restructuring by owner Taylor & Francis. He joined Cooper Union and served as dean of the faculty of humanities and social sciences from 2006 to 2017, and concurrently teaches English literature, lecturing on Shakespeare.

Germano has written a guidebook on the Syllabus, titled Syllabus: The Remarkable, Unremarkable Document That Changes Everything, and guidebooks on dissertation writing, including Getting It Published: A Guide for Scholars and Anyone Else Serious about Serious Books and From Dissertation to Book, both published by the University of Chicago Press.

References 

Living people

Year of birth missing (living people)
American education writers
American university and college faculty deans
American editors
Columbia College (New York) alumni
Indiana University Bloomington alumni
Cooper Union faculty